, commonly known as Maxell, is a Japanese company that manufactures consumer electronics.

The company's name is a contraction of "Maximum capacity dry cell". Its main products are batteries, wireless charging products, storage devices, LCD/laser projectors, and functional materials. In the past, the company manufactured recording media, including audio cassettes and blank VHS tapes, floppy disks, and recordable optical discs including CD-R/RW and DVD±RW.

On March 4, 2008, Maxell announced that they would outsource the manufacturing of their optical media.

History 
Maxell was formed in 1960, when a dry cell manufacturing plant was created at the company's headquarters in Ibaraki, Osaka. In 1961, Maxell Electric Industrial Company, Limited was created out of the dry battery and magnetic tape divisions of Nitto Electric Industrial Company, Limited (now Nitto Denko Corporation).

On March 18, 2014, the company was listed on the First Section of the Tokyo Stock Exchange. In 2013, Maxell, Ltd. acquired Hitachi Consumer Electronics, Co., Ltd.’s projector design, development and manufacturing assets and resources. On October 1, 2019, Maxell Corporation of America announced it would assume responsibility for all operations related to both Hitachi- brand and Maxell-brand projector products and accessories in the North American market.

Products

Batteries 
Maxell, along with Nagasaki University, NIAIST, and Subaru Corporation (the parent company of Subaru, makers of the R1e electric car), has developed a new chemistry for lithium-ion batteries. Part of the change is dropping the expensive cobalt element and using "nano infused lithium" with manganese, with twenty times more power storage, and the ability to mass-produce it inexpensively.

Audio cassettes 

During the height of the Compact Audio Cassette's popularity, Maxell's audio cassettes were held in high regard, producing some of the finest examples of the standard available. The performance of the XLII-S (CrO2) and MX (pure metal particles) cassettes was highly regarded in the pre-digital domestic recording medium.

Until the beginning of 2020, Maxell still produced UR ferric-oxide-based cassettes for the international market. Maxell has since stopped distributing their UR cassettes outside of Japan.

Maxell audio cassettes were available in 46, 60, 90, 100, 120 and 150 minute lengths. Currently, depending on region, they are available in 10, 20, 30, 40, 46, 50, 54, 60, 64, 70, 74, 80, 90, 100, 110, 120 and 150 minute lengths.

Optical storages 

Since November 2006 the Taiwanese Ritek corporation became exclusive producer of Maxell CD-Rs and DVDs.

LCD and laser projectors 
Maxell now assumes responsibility for all Hitachi-brand and Maxell-brand LCD projectors and laser projectors, as well as the Lecture Capture Collaboration Station. Maxell projectors are available in a range of lumens, resolutions, sizes, and colors for classrooms, conference rooms, houses of worship, and venues.

Advertising 

In the 1980s, Maxell became an icon of pop culture when it produced advertisements popularly known as "Blown Away Guy" for its line of audio cassettes. The campaign began as a two-page advertising spread in Rolling Stone magazine in 1980. The photo shows a man sitting low in a (Le Corbusier Grand Confort LC2) high armed chair (on the right side of the screen) in front of, and facing, a JBL L100 speaker (the left side of the screen). His hair and necktie, along with the lampshade to the man's right and the martini glass on the low table to the man's left, are being blown back by the tremendous sound from speakers in front of him—supposedly due to the audio accuracy of Maxell's product. The man is shown desperately clinging to the armrests but defiantly looking ahead at the source of the music through sunglasses, though calmly catching his drink before it slides off the end table.

The ad campaign was conceived by Art Director Lars Anderson. Steve Steigman was the photographer. Steigman wanted a male model with long hair in order to show the effect of the wind, but when such a model could not be found on the day of the shoot, they used the makeup artist who was hired for the shoot, Jac Colello.

The same concept was used for television spots in 1981 which ran throughout the 1980s. These commercials showed nearly the same image as the print ad, but with the chair, a drink and nearby lamp all being pushed away from the stereo by the strong force of the sound waves. Richard Wagner's "Ride of the Valkyries" was used for music. A separate ad was filmed for the United Kingdom, with musician Peter Murphy of the group Bauhaus as the man in the chair, and "Night on Bald Mountain" by Modest Mussorgsky as the music.

The "blown away guy" image became quite popular, and has been copied and parodied numerous times, including in the 1992 John Ritter film Stay Tuned (where a character's head is blown off by a "Max-Hell" tape), in the 2005 episode "Model Misbehavior" of animated sitcom Family Guy, and in the 2010 movie Jackass 3D, where Ryan Dunn sits in a chair while the blast from a jet engine sends the set blowing away. The comic strip Bloom County also parodied the ad in showing one of its characters, Milo Bloom, at home watching MTV.

In 2005, Maxell revived the "Blown Away Guy" ad campaign. As Maxell now made blank DVDs and CDs, headphones, speakers, and blank audio and video tape, the ads were updated with photos of iPods and accessories underneath the image. "Get blown away" was the headline, while the copy urged consumers to use Maxell accessories to "make your small iPod sound like a huge audio system".

See also 
 List of digital camera brands
 Cassette demagnetizer

References

External links 

 
 Company profile from Hoover's Online
 
 

Hitachi
Electronics companies of Japan
Battery manufacturers
Consumer battery manufacturers
Electronics companies established in 1960
Japanese companies established in 1960
Companies listed on the Tokyo Stock Exchange
Japanese brands
Companies based in Kyoto Prefecture